Kevin Bond may refer to:

Kevin Bond (English footballer) (born 1957), former English footballer and manager
Kevin Bond (Australian footballer) (1928–1991), Australian rules footballer
Kevin Bond (musician), musician with Superjoint Ritual